Fireball Jungle is a 1968 melodrama directed by Joseph P. Mawra and starring John Russell and Lon Chaney, Jr. The film featured the hit single, "Love (Can Make You Happy)" by Mercy and was filmed in and around Tampa, Florida.

Plot
Gangster Nero Sagittarius hires stock car driver Cateye Meares, leader of a band of sadistic thugs, to help him gain control of several automobile racetracks. Steve Cullen, whose brother was killed in an accident caused by Cateye, races under an alias while attempting to implicate the murderer. Infuriated by Steve's skill, Cateye assaults him. After Sammy, a junkyard owner forced to fence stolen cars for Nero's syndicate, is burned alive, Steve fights Cateye in his hideout. Although badly beaten, Steve attempts to expose Cateye. During the big race, Cateye is killed in a spectacular crash while being chased by the police.

Cast
 John Russell as Nero Solitarius
 Lon Chaney, Jr. as Old Sam
 Alan Mixon as Ronald Elwood "Cateye" Meares
 Randy Kirby as Steve Cullen
 Chuck Daniel as Marty
 Nancy Donohue as Ann Tracey
 Vicki Nunis as Judy
 Billy Blueriver as Moose
 Mercy as themselves
 Babs Beatty as fruit stand woman
 Tiny Kennedy as nightclub singer

External links
 IMDB Listing

References

1968 films
1968 crime drama films
American auto racing films
American sports drama films
1960s English-language films
1960s American films